Delovoy Tsentr is a station on the Moscow Central Circle of the Moscow Metro that opened in September 2016.

Name
The station is named for the adjacent Moscow International Business Center, also known as Moscow City. The station was originally planned to be Citi, but was changed to Delovoy Tsentr prior to the opening of the line.

Transfer 
The station offers out-of-station transfers to the Filyovskaya Line at Mezhdunarodnaya; but there is no direct interchange corridor to the namesake station of the Kalininsko-Solntsevskaya Line and Bolshaya Koltsevaya line

Gallery

References

External links 
 mkzd.ru

Moscow Metro stations
Railway stations in Russia opened in 2016
Moscow Central Circle stations